Karaikal Ammaiyar Temple is a Hindu temple dedicated to the goddess Punithavathi. It is located on Bharathiar Street, in the center of Karaikal, India. Ammaiyar, or Goddess Punithavathi, is a renowned goddess in Karaikal.

History
The temple was constructed by Malaiperumal Pillai in 1929. The main goddess is Punithavati, also known as Karaikkal Ammaiyar. There is also a sanctum for Vinayaka inside this temple. Karaikal Ammaiyar is one of the 63 Nayanmars. Karaikal Ammaiyar (also known as Punithavathi)  was born to Dhanathathanar, from a merchant community knows as Nattukottai Nagarathar (also Known as Nattukottai Chettiar)

Festival
The Mangani Tirunal festival (the festival of the mango fruit) is observed in the Tamil month of Aani on the full moon day. The belief is that Karaikal Ammaiyar gave Annam (food) to Bhikshatanar during his tour around the world begging alms. Since she gave him with curd rice and mangoes, those items are distributed on the festival day, in a big hall adjacent to the temple.

Nearby Places
 Karaikal Kailasanathar Temple
 Nithyakalyana Perumal Temple
 Chandra Theertham tank
 Tirunallar Saniswaran Temple(in Thirunallar)

See also
 Karaikal district

References

Hindu temples in Puducherry
Karaikal